The Rakuten Taoyuan Baseball Stadium, originally known as Taoyuan International Baseball Stadium until Rakuten acquired the naming rights in 2022, is a multi-use stadium located in Taoyuan City, Taiwan. The stadium opened in 2009 and it has a capacity of 20,000 spectators.

Transportation
The stadium is accessible within walking distance southwest of Taoyuan Sports Park Station of Taoyuan Metro.

See also
 List of stadiums in Taiwan
 Sport in Taiwan

References 

2010 establishments in Taiwan
Baseball venues in Taiwan
Buildings and structures in Taoyuan City
Rakuten Monkeys
Sports venues completed in 2010